The defeat of Leonnatus by Antiphilus occurred during the Lamian War (323–322 BC) fought between the Greek allies who had rebelled against the Macedonian Empire, and Leonnatus, the Macedonian satrap of Phrygia, who had come to aid the regent Antipater, who was being besieged by the Greeks in Lamia. The Greeks defeated the Macedonians.

The Greeks, hearing news of Leonnatus's advance, lifted the siege of Lamia and detached their baggage train and camp followers to Melitia and advanced with their army hurried to defeat Leonnatus before Antipater's forces could join him. The Greeks and Macedonian armies were equal in number but the Greeks' 3,500 horsemen, including an elite 2,000 Thessalians commanded by Menon, against the Macedonians' 1,500 horse gave the advantage of mobility to the Greeks.

When the battle began, although the Macedonian phalanx gained the advantage everywhere, the Thessalians drove off the Macedonian cavalry and Leonnatus was carried from the battlefield already mortally wounded. After their cavalry was driven back the unsupported Macedonian Phalanx retreated from the plain to difficult terrain where the enemy cavalry couldn't pursue them. 

The next day Antipater arrived at the field and joined with the defeated army. He decided not to fight the Greeks yet, in view of their superior cavalry, and instead retreated through the rough terrain.

References 

Battles of the Lamian War
Battles involving Macedonia (ancient kingdom)
322 BC
Battles in Hellenistic Thessaly